Renaissance Tower is a  skyscraper in Sacramento, California,  completed in 1989. The 28 story tower was the tallest in the city when completed, and is now the fifth. At one time owned by USAA Real Estate Company, the building was sold in January 2016 to GPT Properties Trust of Maryland.

See also
List of tallest buildings in Sacramento

References

External links

SkyscraperPage.com: More information and photos

Office buildings completed in 1989
Buildings and structures in Sacramento, California
Skyscraper office buildings in Sacramento, California